Ashok Dogra is an Indian politician and member of the Bharatiya Janata Party. He is a two term member of the Rajasthan Legislative Assembly. He is a member of 15th Rajasthan Legislative Assembly representing the Bundi constituency as an MLA.

Constituency
Dogra was elected twice from the Bundi Vidhan Sabha constituency of Rajasthan.

References 

People from Bundi
Bharatiya Janata Party politicians from Rajasthan
Members of the Rajasthan Legislative Assembly
Living people
21st-century Indian politicians
Year of birth missing (living people)